Michael Gras (born 15 September 1991) is a French long-distance runner.

In 2015, he won the silver medal in the men's 5000 metres event at the 2015 French Athletics Championships.

In 2019, he competed in the senior men's race at the 2019 IAAF World Cross Country Championships held in Aarhus, Denmark. He finished in 71st place.

References

External links 
 

Living people
1991 births
Place of birth missing (living people)
French male long-distance runners
French male cross country runners
21st-century French people